Whyalla Conservation Park (formerly Whyalla National Park) is a protected area located in the Australian state of South Australia about  north of the centre of city of Whyalla immediately adjoining the Lincoln Highway.

 The conservation park was proclaimed under the National Parks and Wildlife Act 1972 in 1972 in respect to an area of land already under statutory protection since 4 November 1971 as the "Whyalla National Park."  The conservation park was described in 1998 in one source as follows:…it is acknowledged as a fine example of the Western myall/chenopod (Acacia papyrocarpa/chenopod) woodland so characteristic of north-eastern Eyre Peninsula.  It was conserved both for the conservation value of this woodland and for its position only 10 km north of the City of Whyalla.  It was intended to serve a recreational purpose for Whyalla as a picnic site.   

The conservation park has been located within the suburb of Whyalla Barson since 2011 and is classified as an IUCN Category III protected area. In 1980, it was listed on the now-defunct Register of the National Estate.

See also
 Protected areas of South Australia

References

External links
The Friends of The Whyalla Conservation Park website
Entry for Whyalla Conservation Park on Protected Planet

Conservation parks of South Australia
Protected areas established in 1971
1971 establishments in Australia
Whyalla
South Australian places listed on the defunct Register of the National Estate
Gawler bioregion